Gjengangeren is a local newspaper published in Horten, Norway. It was established in 1851.

It has a circulation of 5867, of whom 5732 are subscribers.

References
Norwegian Media Registry

External links
Website

Publications established in 1851
1851 establishments in Norway
Daily newspapers published in Norway
Mass media in Horten